The Congo palm gecko (Urocotyledon palmata) is a species of lizard in the family Gekkonidae. It is found in Cameroon, Gabon, and the Republic of the Congo.

References

Urocotyledon
Geckos of Africa
Reptiles of Cameroon
Reptiles of Gabon
Reptiles of the Republic of the Congo
Reptiles described in 1902
Taxa named by François Mocquard